Pima Canyon is a major canyon located in the Santa Catalina Mountains, north of Catalina Foothills and Tucson, Arizona, US. Pusch Ridge forms the northwestern cliffs of Pima Canyon, dramatically rising from Pima Creek on the canyon floor. Mount Kimball is the highest peak in the vicinity of the canyon.

Geography
The creek flows intermittently throughout the year, usually after substantial rain or snow melt in the Santa Catalina Mountains.

Pima Canyon, which is called a desert riparian habitat, has good opportunities for birdwatching. Many desert creatures can be seen, the larger of which are jackrabbits, javelina, and desert bighorn sheep. Because of its proximity to the Tucson metropolitan area, Pima Canyon is described as "overused", especially during the mild local winters. Many varieties of desert plants can be seen along the trail including the ocotillo, prickly pear, palo verde, mesquite, and the ubiquitous saguaro.

Pima Canyon Trail
From Oro Valley, the Pima Canyon trailhead can be reached by driving east from Oracle Road (Arizona Highway 77) on Magee Road until it dead ends. From Ina Road, take Christie Drive north until it intersects with Magee and turn right. The Pima Canyon Trail is numbered # 62. The trailhead carries the name Iris O. Dewhirst.

The lowest elevation at the trailhead is  while the highest elevation at the dam is  according to the Sierra Club. The trail has a difficulty rating of C and is called a "popular and easy hike". The Sierra Club website estimates that the  round trip to the lower dam and back can take two and a half hours. Another source states that the round trip is three hours or more. The US Forest Service does not permit dogs or motorized vehicles on the trail.

From the parking lot, the trail heads east toward the mouth of the canyon. Signs indicate that private property surrounds the trail at this point and request that hikers stay on the well-marked trail. After a few minutes, a hiker will come upon a metal sign pointing to the left and indicating that Mount Kimball is 7 miles away. Follow the sign to the left. The hiker soon enters the canyon and steep rock faces rise on both sides on the canyon. After about 45 minutes from the start, hikers will arrive at a place where there are some cottonwood trees. Another 30 to 40 minutes will bring hikers to the small dam. Nearby, there are potholes in the rock that Native Americans used for grinding.

The trail gets steeper and more difficult in this stretch. The round trip hike to Pima Spring is considered a "nice day hike" as an alternative to the full seven miles to Mount Kimball. From Pima Spring to Mount Kimball, the trail is very steep and hard to follow. There is a metal sign that points to Pima Saddle, which is on the crest of Pusch Ridge. The hike to the Pima Saddle and back is said to take eight or more hours.

From Pima Saddle, the trail is faint and hikers must keep an eye out for cairns. The view from Mount Kimball is said to be spectacular. The US Forest Service website notes that the trail is  one-way in length. Near Mount Kimball, trail # 62 intersects with the Finger Rock Trail # 42.

Pima Canyon Trail Photos

Notes
Footnotes

Citations

References
 arizona.sierraclub.org Pima Canyon to the Dam – Sierra Club Tucson Trail Guide: 
 Brinkerhoff, Rob. localhikes.com Mount Kimball: Pima Canyon Trail
 fs.fed.us/r3/coronado Pima Canyon Trail # 62
 Cherba, R. Scott. cherba.com Pima Canyon Trail

Santa Catalina Mountains
Geography of Tucson, Arizona
Canyons and gorges of Arizona
Landforms of Pima County, Arizona